Fraser Ministry may refer to:

 First Fraser Ministry
 Second Fraser Ministry
 Third Fraser Ministry
 Fourth Fraser Ministry